Tetsuaki Misawa (born 28 January 1999) is a Japanese professional footballer who currently plays for Sudeva Delhi of the I-League.

Club career 
Until 2021 Misawa played for the Kanagawa University team in the 2nd Division of the Kantō Soccer League. Prior to the 2021 season, he signed his first professional contract with BCH Lions of the Mongolian Premier League. He ultimately spent one season with the club, tallying five assists and seventeen goals in sixteen matches to win the league Golden Boot Award as top scorer. He left the club in pursuit of opportunities in other countries with an interest in playing in Bangladesh, Cambodia, and Singapore.

By November 2021 Misawa had signed for Muktijoddha Sangsad KC of the Bangladesh Premier League. He quickly made an impact, scoring a goal against Mohammedan SC and two more against Saif Sporting Club in the 2021 Independence Cup. On 25 February 2022, he scored the game-winning goal as Muktijoddha Sangsad earned its first victory of the 2021–22 Bangladesh Premier League season.

Misawa signed for Sudeva Delhi FC of India's I-League for the 2022–23 campaign. He scored his first league goal for the club on 26 November 2022 in a defeat to Rajasthan United FC.

References

External links 
Soccerway profile

1999 births
Living people
Japanese footballers
Japanese expatriate footballers
Association football forwards
Mongolian National Premier League players
BCH Lions players
Muktijoddha Sangsad KC players
Bangladesh Football Premier League players
Sudeva Delhi FC players
I-League players